Matt Fornataro (born June 26, 1985) is a Canadian former professional ice hockey forward.

Playing career
Undrafted, Fornataro made his professional debut with the Syracuse Crunch of the American Hockey League at the conclusion of the 2007–08 season.

On February 21, 2012, Fornataro was included in an NHL transaction, when he was dealt from the Norfolk Admirals, an affiliate of the Tampa Bay Lightning to the Rockford IceHogs in exchange for Brandon Segal.

On June 25, 2013, after his first season abroad in Sweden with VIK Västerås HK of the HockeyAllsvenskan it was announced that Fornataro would be joining Leksands IF for the 2013–14 SHL season. Fornataro struggled to establish himself within the SHL with Leksands and after 29 games he returned to VIK Västerås HK for the remainder of the season.

After splitting the 2014–15 season between Västerås and Mora IK, Fornataro left the second division and signed a one-year contract with Austrian club, Graz 99ers of the EBEL on August 30, 2015.

Career statistics

Awards and honours

References

External links

1985 births
Living people
Calgary Royals players
Graz 99ers players
Houston Aeros (1994–2013) players
Leksands IF players
Manchester Monarchs (ECHL) players
Mora IK players
New Hampshire Wildcats men's ice hockey players
Norfolk Admirals players
Phoenix RoadRunners players
Rockford IceHogs (AHL) players
South Carolina Stingrays players
Ice hockey people from Calgary
Syracuse Crunch players
VIK Västerås HK players
Waterloo Black Hawks players
Worcester Sharks players
Canadian ice hockey centres
AHCA Division I men's ice hockey All-Americans